Jessie may refer to:

People and fictional characters
 Jessie (given name), including a list of people and fictional characters
 Jessie (surname), a list of people

Arts and entertainment
 Jessie (2011 TV series), a 2011–15 Disney Channel sitcom
 Jessie (1984 TV series), a series starring Lindsay Wagner
 Jessie (film), a 2016 Indian film
 "Jessie" (song), by Joshua Kadison
 "Jessie", by Uriah Heep from the album Outsider
 Jessie Richardson Theatre Award, also known as the Jessie Award

Places

Australia 
Jessie, South Australia, a former town
 Jessie Island, Queensland, Australia

Canada 
 Jessie Lake, Alberta, Canada

South Orkney Islands 
 Jessie Bay, South Orkney Islands, north-east of Antarctica

United States 
 Jessie, North Dakota, United States, a census-designated place
 Lake Jessie (Winter Haven, Florida), United States
 Lake Jessie (North Dakota), United States

Technology
 Jessie, the codename of version 8 of the Debian Linux operating system

See also
 Jesse (disambiguation)
 Jessi (disambiguation)
 Jessy (disambiguation)
 Jesus (disambiguation)
 Jess (disambiguation)
 Jessica (disambiguation)